R. Suzanne Zukin is an American neuroscientist and a professor of neuroscience who directs a research lab as a F. M. Kirby Chair in Neural Repair and Protection and director of the Neuropsychopharmacology Center at Albert Einstein College of Medicine. Zukin's areas of research include neurodegenerative disorders, Ischemia, Epigenetics and Autism and uses molecular biology approaches to research these disorders. Zukin has made seminal contributions to the understanding of NMDA and AMPA receptor function and activity.

Early career 
After receiving a bachelor's degree from Bryn Mawr College in 1970, Zukin started her path as a molecular biologist with an understanding of protein structure-function relationships while working on her doctoral dissertation with Donald P. Hollis at Johns Hopkins Medical School. She subsequently pursued postdoctoral work with Daniel E. Koshland Jr. at UC Berkeley where she investigated ligand binding and conformational changes in sensory receptors.

Neuroscience career and research 
In 1977 Suzanne Zukin joined the department of Biochemistry at Albert Einstein College of Medicine.

Currently, the lab is part of the Neuroscience department at Albert Einstein, where Zukin presides as Director of the Neurophsycopharmacology Center and F.M. Kirby Chair in Neural Repair and Protection.

Currently, the lab is pursuing the following research questions related to molecular mechanisms of dysregulation of gene expression of synaptic proteins:

Epigenetic control of synaptic proteins: The Zukin lab researches epigenetic mechanisms that underlie neuronal death in animal models of stroke. They investigate the role of the gene silencing transcription factor RE1-silencing transcription factor (REST) and REST-dependent epigenetic remodeling of genes encoding synaptic proteins. The lab also pursues REST mediated experience-tuning expression of NMDA receptors during development, demonstrating that maternal deprivation disrupts a REST mediated switch to mature NMDA receptor expression

Molecular pathways leading to aberrations in Autism and fragile X syndrome: The Zukin lab aims to identify protein expression dysregulation that may result in the phenotypes observed in autism spectrum disorders. The lab has found that the downstream targets of mTORC2, Rho GTPase Rac1 and LIMK exhibit increased expression in a mouse model of autism. Elevated expression of proteins in this pathway are causally related to reduced activity of the actin depolymerizing factor Cofilin, a major determinant of dendritic spine morphology. Another marker of fragile X syndrome that the lab identified is an elevation of GluA2 (GluR2) mRNA as a result of increased CPEB3 protein expression. Elevated GluA2 mRNA increases the percent of AMPA receptors containing GluA2, thus potentially altering the transmission properties and excitation properties of neurons in the brains of individuals with autism spectrum disorders.

Publications 
Zukin has published almost 200 papers in peer-reviewed scientific journals

Notable research articles

Awards and honors 
2009 McKnight Foundation Neuroscience of Brain Disorders Award

Simons Foundation Autism Research Initiative

F.M. Kirby Chair in Neural Repair and Protection

Director of the Neurophsycopharmacology Center at Albert Einstein College of Medicine

Standing member of the NIH Study Section on Neural Oxidative Metabolism and Death for the National Institute for Neurologic Disorders & Stroke

2014 Brain and Behavior Research Foundation Distinguished Investigator award for "REST-dependent epigenetic remodeling of NMDA receptors as a risk factor in schizophrenia."

Editorial positions: Past and present journals 

Frontiers in Neuroscience 
Genetics & Epigenetics
Journal of Neuroscience
Neurobiology of Disease
Molecular Brain Research
Journal of Biological Chemistry
Molecular Pharmacology

References 

American neuroscientists
Albert Einstein College of Medicine faculty
Bryn Mawr College alumni
Johns Hopkins School of Medicine alumni
American women neuroscientists
Academic journal editors
Year of birth missing (living people)
Living people
American women academics
21st-century American women